Nicole de Boer  is a Canadian actress.  She is best known for starring in the cult film Cube as Joan Leaven, playing Ezri Dax on the final season of Star Trek: Deep Space Nine (1998–1999), and as Sarah Bannerman on the series The Dead Zone (2002–2007). Since 2016 to 2021, she had a recurring role as Becca Dorsay, ex-wife of one of the series leads on the Canadian-produced crime drama Private Eyes.

Career
De Boer's television debut was an uncredited role in Freddy the Freeloader's Christmas Dinner, which starred Red Skelton and Vincent Price. Her first major television work was in the CBC series 9B, followed by a recurring role on the Canadian sketch comedy show The Kids in the Hall as Laura, girlfriend of Bobby Terrance (Bruce McCulloch). She subsequently appeared (as a different character) in their 1996 film Kids in the Hall: Brain Candy.

She starred in the short-lived 1997 SyFy Channel series Deepwater Black (also known as Mission Genesis) as Yuna. This was followed by a role in the film, Cube (1997). She was featured in two episodes of the Canadian-produced series The Outer Limits.

De Boer's other roles have included Ezri Dax on Star Trek: Deep Space Nine'''s final season (1998–1999), and as Sarah Bannerman on the series The Dead Zone (2002–2007).

She portrayed Dr. Alison Porter on the SyFy series Stargate Atlantis, appearing in the fifth-season episode "Whispers", and as Marion Caldwell on three episodes of the television series Haven''.

Filmography

Films

Television

References

External links

Living people
Canadian people of Dutch descent
Actresses from Toronto
Canadian film actresses
Canadian television actresses
20th-century Canadian actresses
21st-century Canadian actresses
1970 births